The Kansas State Wildcats volleyball program is the intercollegiate volleyball program of the Kansas State University Wildcats. The program is classified in the NCAA Division I, and the team competes in the Big 12 Conference. Kansas State's volleyball team began competition in 1974. Suzie Fritz was the most recent head coach, serving as head coach from 2001 to 2022.

History
While the program was moderately successful through much of their early years, finishing with just over a .500 winning percentage in the 1970s, Kansas State Volleyball struggled throughout much of the 1980s and early 1990s, not making a single NCAA tournament appearance or finishing with an above .500 record in Big Eight play. From 1991 to 1993, the program only won one game in conference play (coming in 1991), finishing 0–12 both in 1992 and 1993.

The program direction started to change however, with the hiring of Jim Moore in 1994. While only modestly improving to 3–9 in Big Eight play in his first year, the Wildcats won 21 games in 1995, and finished 1996 with 26 wins, and tied for fourth in the newly minted Big 12 Conference. 1996 also marked the program's first ever berth into the NCAA women's volleyball tournament, where they defeated Cal State Northridge in the first round before losing to Washington State in the Second round. While Moore left the program before the 1997 season for Big 12 Rival University of Texas, his tenure marked a tremendous turnaround for the program.

Jim McLaughlin followed Jim Moore in the 1997 season, leading the program to four more consecutive NCAA Tournament berths during each year of his tenure, including their first ever NCAA Sweet Sixteen berth in the 2000 season. His time as head coach of the program marked a period of continued success for the Wildcats.

2013 World University games
The Kansas State volleyball team served as the U.S. national squad at the 2013 Summer Universiade in Russia. The team posted a 1–5 record at the tournament.

Season results

Coaches' history
All-Time coaches:
 Ann Heider (1974): 22–20–4, .524
 Mary Phyl Dwight (1975–78): 107–91–05, .540
 Ron Spies (1979): 15–16–3, .686
 Scott Nelson (1980–90): 168–176–1, .488
 Patti Hagemeyer (1991–93): 24–66, .267
 Jim Moore (1994–96): 61–34, .642
 Jim McLaughlin (1997–2000): 82–43, 
 Suzie Fritz (2001–2022): 393–263, 
 Jason Mansfield (2023–present): 0–0

See also
List of NCAA Division I women's volleyball programs

References

External links